A One Day International (ODI) is an international cricket match between two representative teams, each having ODI status, as determined by the International Cricket Council (ICC). An ODI differs from Test matches in that the number of overs per team is limited, and that each team has only one innings. Oman earned One Day International (ODI) in April 2019 as a result of their performance at the 2019 ICC World Cricket League Division Two (WCL2). Oman's first ODI match was the final of the WCL2 against Namibia on 27 April 2019.

The list is arranged in the order in which each player won his first ODI cap. Where more than one player won his first ODI cap in the same match, those players are listed alphabetically by surname.

Key

Players
Statistics are correct as of 14 June 2022.

See also 
List of Oman Twenty20 International cricketers

References

 
Oman ODI